Abdul Basir was a citizen of Afghanistan who died while in the custody of Afghanistan's intelligence service the National Directorate of Security (NDS).

Basir, and three other family members, were apprehended on 28 October, on suspicion they had an association with the bombing of a Kabul guesthouse that housed foreigners. Basir died on 7 December. Government officials claimed he had committed suicide by jumping out a window. But human rights workers assert that when his body was returned to his family it bore scars more consistent with torture than defenstration.
His family claimed that his brothers and father, who were still in custody, would face retaliation, if Basir's family arranged for an autopsy.

See also
 Dilawar
 Gul Rahman
 Bagram torture and prisoner abuse

References

Year of birth missing
2009 deaths
Afghan torture victims
Victims of human rights abuses
Afghan people who died in prison custody